Daniele Garozzo (born 4 August 1992) is an Italian right-handed foil fencer. 

Garozzo is a 2022 team European champion, two-time individual European champion, and four-time team world champion.

A two-time Olympian, Garozzo is a 2021 individual Olympic silver medalist and 2016 individual Olympic champion.

He is the younger brother of Italian épée fencer Enrico Garozzo.

Career
Garozzo won the 2008 Cadet World Championships at home in Acireale, then took a silver medal in the 2011 and 2012 Junior World Championships. In the 2013 Summer Universiade he was defeated in the semifinals by Russia's Aleksey Cheremisinov and came away with a bronze medal. In the 2014–15 season he climbed his first World Cup podium with a silver medal in the Challenge International de Paris. He earned a silver medal at the 2015 European Championships after being defeated in the final by teammate Andrea Cassarà.

Ranked number 11 in the world, Garozzo was the surprise winner of the gold medal in the Men's Individual Foil at the 2016 Summer Olympics, beating the American world number 1 Alexander Massialas in the final; his victory raised his world ranking to number 2. Yet in the same event at the next Olympics in 2021, he was defeated by Cheung Ka Long from Hong Kong with a score of 15-11, claiming his first Olympic silver medal.

In June 2022, Garozzo won the gold medal in the men's foil event at the 2022 European Fencing Championships held in Antalya, Turkey.

Medal Record

Olympic Games

World Championship

European Championship

Grand Prix

World Cup

References

External links
 
 

1992 births
Living people
Italian male fencers
Italian foil fencers
People from Acireale
Fencers at the 2016 Summer Olympics
Fencers at the 2020 Summer Olympics
Olympic fencers of Italy
Medalists at the 2016 Summer Olympics
Medalists at the 2020 Summer Olympics
Olympic gold medalists for Italy
Olympic silver medalists for Italy
Olympic medalists in fencing
Universiade medalists in fencing
Universiade bronze medalists for Italy
Fencers of Fiamme Gialle
World Fencing Championships medalists
Medalists at the 2013 Summer Universiade
Sportspeople from the Province of Catania